is the 31st single by the Japanese J-pop group Every Little Thing, released on June 14, 2006.

Track listing
  (Words - Kaori Mochida / music - HIKARI)
 Baby Love (Words & music - Lamont Dozier & Brian Holland & Eddie Holland)

Chart positions

External links
  information at Avex Network.
  information at Oricon.

2006 singles
Every Little Thing (band) songs
Songs written by Kaori Mochida
2006 songs